From Ritual to Romance is a 1920 book written by Jessie Weston.

Weston's book is an examination of the roots of the King Arthur legends. It seeks to make connections between the early pagan elements and the later Christian influences. The book's main focus is on the Holy Grail tradition and its influence, particularly the Wasteland motif.

The origins of Weston's book are in James George Frazer's seminal work on folklore, magic and religion, The Golden Bough (1890), and in the works of Jane Ellen Harrison.

The work is mentioned by T. S. Eliot in the notes to his poem The Waste Land.

Trivia
The book appears in the film Apocalypse Now (1979), among those kept by the character, Colonel Walter E. Kurtz, played by Marlon Brando, along with The Golden Bough.

The book appears in the limited series Batman: Tenses, in which it is thrown in a fire by Ted Krosby before he kills his father.

The book also appears in the Oliver Stone film The Doors.

References

External links

 

1920 non-fiction books
Arthurian literature
Works about the Holy Grail